Russell Simpson (born 22 February 1954) is a former tennis player from New Zealand, who won five doubles titles during his professional career. He reached his highest singles ATP ranking on 18 April 1983, when he became No. 47 in the world. He is currently the head tennis professional at the Beverly Hills Tennis Club in Beverly Hills, California.

Simpson is the younger brother of Jeff Simpson, who was also a professional tennis player.

Career finals

Doubles (5 titles, 4 runner-ups)

References

External links
 
 
 

1954 births
Living people
New Zealand male tennis players
Tennis players from Auckland